= Starmobile Up Mini =

Starmobile UP Mini
- Brand: Starmobile
- Manufacturer: Starmobile
- Type: Smartphone
- Series: UP Series
- First released: November 2014
- Compatible networks: 3G, HSPA+
- Form factor: Touchscreen
- Dimensions: 133.4×66.4×9.3 mm (5.25×2.61×0.37 in)
- Operating system: Android 4.4 KitKat
- CPU: 1.3 GHz quad-core MediaTek
- GPU: Mali-400MP2
- Memory: 1 GB RAM
- Storage: 4 GB
- Removable storage: microSD
- SIM: Dual SIM, Dual-Standby
- Battery: 1550 mAh removable Li-Ion
- Rear camera: 8 MP with BSI sensor and LED flash
- Front camera: VGA
- Display: 4.5-inch FWVGA IPS LCD display (480 x 854 pixels)

The Starmobile UP Mini is an entry-level Android smartphone released by Philippine mobile brand Starmobile in November 2014. The device launched alongside the Starmobile UP Lite as part of the company's UP smartphone lineup.

== Specifications ==
The device is equipped with a 4.5-inch FWVGA IPS LCD screen featuring a resolution of 480 × 854 pixels. Under the hood, it runs on a 1.3 GHz quad-core MediaTek processor paired with a Mali-400MP2 graphics processor, 1 GB of RAM, and 4 GB of internal storage, which can be expanded via a microSD card. For optics, the smartphone features an 8-megapixel rear camera with Back-Side Illumination (BSI) and an LED flash, alongside a front-facing VGA camera intended for video calling and self-portraits.

Out of the box, the Starmobile UP Mini runs Android 4.4 KitKat. Physical dimensions measure 133.4 × 66.4 × 9.3 mm, and power is supplied by a removable 1,550 mAh battery.
